30 Greatest Hits may refer to:

30 Greatest Hits (Aretha Franklin album), 1985
30 Greatest Hits (Red Elvises album), 2006
30 Greatest Hits, an album by La Sombra, 1997
Get Stoned (30 Greatest Hits), an album by The Rolling Stones, 1977